Raúl Arellano Gallo (born 17 January 1939) is a Mexican former footballer. He competed in the men's tournament at the 1964 Summer Olympics.

References

External links
 

1939 births
Living people
Mexican footballers
Mexico international footballers
Olympic footballers of Mexico
Footballers at the 1964 Summer Olympics
Footballers from Guadalajara, Jalisco
Association football forwards
Cruz Azul footballers